Steve Swindells (born 21 November 1952) is an English singer-songwriter, keyboardist, party organizer, club promoter and journalist.

Life and career

Early life
Swindells grew up in the Bath and Bristol area, dropping out of art college to play keyboards with the rock band Squidd (which was put together by drummer and fantasy artist, Rodney Matthews). Relocating to London in 1973 and living in squats, he recorded his debut solo album, Messages for RCA in 1974. Produced by his manager Mark Edwards, Swindells felt the production quality to be poor, despite the presence of quality musicians. A follow up album Swindells' Swallow was recorded, mastered and test pressings manufactured, but the deal fell through.

Departed from his manager, Swindells joined Pilot, recording the 1977 album Two's a Crowd. In 1978 he joined a reformed Hawkwind, renamed as Hawklords, for the 25 Years On album and tour.

1980s
In 1980 he recorded another solo album, Fresh Blood, released by ATCO, but was dropped when it failed to hit sufficient sales, despite reaching No. 3 in the US airplay charts.  Swindells would go on contribute songs to Roger Daltrey on "Martyrs and Madmen" and "Treachery" for Daltrey's 1982 compilation album Best Bits, before temporarily turning his attention away from the music business. In 1983, Swindells switched careers to club promoting and party organising.

1990s
In the early 1990s, he decided to re-invent himself as a journalist, writing the internet column for Time Out under the name Spyder for many years, as well as a gadget/lifestyle colourmn for Attitude, before becoming the editor of the magazine's website. Throughout his career changes, Swindells continued to compose and perform music.

2000s
In 2003, Swindells played keyboards and sang lead vocals in the band Danmingo together with Jerry Richards, Jon Moss and Winston Blissett. Swindells wrote all of the songs, apart from two band collaborations and one co-write with Stephen Meade (aka Shanks) and the late Kent Brainerd. As of 10 December 2013, Swindells had been number 1 on the Reverb Nation Singer-songwriter Chart For London for several days. He then released the double download DanMingo album under his own name.

In 2009, Swindells was instrumental in the formation (or reformation) of the Hawklords, a musical collective of ex-Hawkwind members, playing a special show in memory of artist Barney Bubbles. The show was advertised as a benefit concert 'with a view to setting up a foundation/annual award for innovative album cover design, and a memorial plaque for him'. However, there is no evidence that the proceeds of the concert were used for any of these purposes.

2010–present
In 2010, Hawklords performed a mini tour of the UK. In 2011, the group were active in several appearances across the UK, and a touring line-up underwent a full national tour in October 2011. In 2012, they announced they were working on an album, titled We Are One. In May 2012, via the band's Facebook page, it was announced that, due to health reasons, Swindells would not be participating in the planned 2012 tour and he subsequently terminated his involvement with the band.

Swindells re-discovered two 'lost' albums from 1980: The Invisible Man, and Treachery. They were released on Flicknife Records on 27 February 2012. His 1980 album Fresh Blood was released on CD for the first time with the label Atomhenge/Cherry Red in August 2009. His 1974 album Messages, along with a bonus CD of the hitherto unreleased Swindells' Swallow, was re-released by Esoteric Recordings/Atomhenge on 26 November 2009.

Early in 2012, Swindells put together an ad-hoc, 'all star' jamming band called The Plastic Sturgeons. Special guest musicians have included Guy Pratt and Dale Davis.  There have only been two gigs to date which were recorded by Roy Weard.  As of 10 December 2013, The Plastic Sturgeons have been number 1 in The Reverb Nation London Jam Chart for several weeks.

Discography

As solo artist
Messages (1974)
Fresh Blood (1980)
 The Lost Albums (Double CD) (released 27 February 2012 on Flicknife Records).
 New Crescent Yard (2011)
 The Hanging Baskets Of Babylon
 DanMingo

With Pilot
Two's a Crowd (1977)

With Hawklords
25 Years On (1978)
Weird Tape 1 (1980)
Weird Tape 2 (1980)
Weird Tape 4 (1981)
Hawkwind, Friends and Relations Volume 1 (1982)
Hawkwind, Friends and Relations Volume 3 (1985)
Hawkwind Anthology Volume 1 (1985)
Hawkwind Anthology Volume 2 (1986)
Hawklords Live (1992)
Hawkwind, Friends and Relations Volume 6 (1996)
Levitation 2009 re-master (first 5 bonus tracks on disc 1) (2009)
Live '78 (2009)

With The Hawklords
Robert Calvert Memorial Concert, Kings Hall, Herne Bay, 28 September 2008 (2009)
Sonic Rock Solstice 2010 (various artists) (2010)
Barney Bubbles Memorial Concert (2011)
We Are One (2012)

Other album appearances
Capdevielle Les Enfants Des Ténèbres Et Les Anges De La Rue (1979)
Spirits Burning & Bridget Wishart Earth Born (2008)
Spirits Burning & Bridget Wishart Bloodlines (2009)

References

External links
 
 Steve Swindells discography and album reviews, credits & releases at AllMusic
 Steve Swindells discography, album releases & credits at Discogs
 Steve Swindells albums to be listened as stream on Spotify

Living people
1952 births
20th-century English male singers
20th-century pianists
21st-century English male singers
21st-century pianists
English keyboardists
English rock pianists
English male songwriters
Hawkwind members
musicians from Ipswich
English gay musicians
English LGBT singers
English LGBT songwriters
Rock songwriters
English rock singers
Gay singers
Gay songwriters
20th-century English LGBT people
21st-century English LGBT people